Cubo may refer to:

 Cubo Architects, a Danish architectural practice
 Cubo Line, part of the defense system built by the Spanish to protect the presidio of St. Augustine
 Casigua-El Cubo, Zulia, Venezuela, a city
 El Cubo Airport, an airport serving the city
 Erick Torres Padilla (born 1993), Mexican professional football player, nicknamed "El Cubo"

See also
 Cubo-Futurism, an art movement in the 20th century in Russia
 Qubo (disambiguation)